Sandelin is a Swedish surname. Notable people with the surname include: 

Scott Sandelin (born 1964), former American professional ice hockey player
Jarmo Sandelin (born 1967), Swedish professional golfer
Christer Sandelin (born 1961), Swedish musician
Torsten Sandelin (1887–1950), Finnish gymnast and yacht racer
Eino Sandelin (1864–1937), Finnish Olympic sailor 

Swedish-language surnames